Róbert Nagy (born 26 November 1987 in Debrecen) is a Hungarian football (Midfielder) player who currently plays for Várda SE.

References

External links
 HLSZ 

1987 births
Living people
Sportspeople from Debrecen
Hungarian footballers
Association football midfielders
Debreceni VSC players
Diósgyőri VTK players
Balmazújvárosi FC players
Kisvárda FC players
Nemzeti Bajnokság I players